Erika Ostrovsky (born May 30, 1926) wrote Céline and his Vision (1967). 

She was born in Vienna and educated mainly in America.

Her interest in Louis-Ferdinand Céline stemmed from a 3-year stay in France, where she studied at the Alliance Française and the Sorbonne. She was Assistant Professor of French at New York University. She has been active in the discovery, identification, and acquisition of important unpublished Céline manuscripts for the New York University Libraries.  

Kurt Vonnegut refers to Céline and his Vision in his book Slaughterhouse Five (1969).

References

External links 
 
 AHC Interview with Erika Ostrovsky

Austrian literary critics
Austrian women literary critics
Austrian emigrants to the United States
New York University faculty
University of Paris alumni
Austrian expatriates in France
Writers from Vienna
Austrian women writers
1926 births
Possibly living people
American expatriates in France